Events in the year 2019 in Lebanon.

Incumbents
President: Michel Aoun 
Prime Minister: Saad Hariri

Events

June
June 3 - 2019 Tripoli shooting: A gunman opened fire and killed four security members in Tripoli, before he blew himself up in an apartment.

August
August 25 - 2019 Beirut drone crash: two drones, alleged to be from Israel by Lebanese authorities, crashed in the Dahieh district of Beirut. The first drone crashed into Hezbollah's Media Center, and the second drone exploded mid-air 45 minutes later. This was the first such incident between Lebanon and Israel since the 2006 war between them.
August 26 - 2019 Qousaya attack: A Popular Front for the Liberation of Palestine base was attacked by Israeli drones in Qousaya, Beqaa Valley, near the Syrian border

October 

 October 13 - 2019 Lebanon forest fires: About 100 forest fires flared up across Lebanon overnight, and lasted until October 15. One person was killed from the fire.
 October 17 - 2019–20 Lebanese protests
October 29 - Prime Minister Saad Hariri resigns in response to protests against the government.

December

 December 19 - Hassan Diab is named Prime Minister of Lebanon.
 December 30 - Carlos Ghosn escapes from Japan and arrives in Beirut.

Deaths

7 January – Jocelyne Saab, journalist and film director (b. 1948).

9 January – Gebran Araiji, politician (b. 1951).

19 January – May Menassa, writer and journalist (b. 1939).

23 January – Georges Nasser, film director (b. 1927).

10 February – Robert Ghanem, lawyer and politician (b. 1942).

References

 
2010s in Lebanon
Years of the 21st century in Lebanon
Lebanon
Lebanon